Dejazmatch Zewde Gebre-Sellassie (12 October 1926 – 15 December 2008) was a prominent nobleman, historian, and former deputy Prime Minister of Ethiopia. He was born in the village of Galdu, in the subdistrict of Mecca, to the north-west of Addis Ababa where his father was relegated.

Early life 
Zewde's father was Dejazmatch Gebre Selassie Baria Gabr (governor of Adwa) and his mother was Leult Wolete Israel Seyoum. His sister was Leult Ijigayehou Asfa Wossen, his grandfather was Ras Seyum Mengesha, and his wife was Woizero Alem Tsehai Araya. He received his rudimentary education in Addis Ababa under a tutor, and went to school in Jerusalem and Cairo respectively where his mother stayed during the Fascist occupation of Ethiopia. After the liberation, he enrolled at the Haile Selassie I secondary school in Addis Ababa and subsequently joined the University of Exeter, England, where he studied English literature. This was followed by legal training at St. Anthony's College, Oxford where he became a senior member of the college from 1963 to 1971, at the conclusion of which he was called to the Bar, Lincoln's Inn, London. After a long interval, during which he held various public offices in Ethiopia, he returned to Oxford and earned his PhD in the composite field of history, politics and economics.

Career 
After his return home in the early 1950s, he held various offices, including that of deputy prime minister.

Under the imperial government he held the following positions:
 Economic attache, later Head of Press, Information and Administration Division, Ministry of Foreign Affairs, 1951–53
 Director-General of Maritime Affairs, 1953–55
 Deputy Minister, Ministry of Public Works, Transport and Civil Aviation, 1955–57
 Mayor and Governor of Addis Ababa, 1957–59
 Ambassador to Somalia, 1959–60
 Minister of Justice, 1961–63
 Permanent Representative to the United Nations, 1972–74
 Minister of the Interior, March–May 1974
 Minister of Foreign Affairs, May–November 1974
In November 1974, the Provisional Military Administrative Council's (Derg) summary execution of high government officials of the previous regime forced Zewde to go into exile. He eventually became vice-president of the United Nations Economic and Social Council, and subsequently worked for several years as advisor to the secretariat of the United Nations. Throughout his service, he received national honors from at least seven sovereign states, including the Federal Republic of Germany. Together with some other prominent Ethiopians, he attempted to mediate between Ethiopia and Eritrea in 1998.

Legacy 
Scholars of African history often compare the passing away of a knowledgeable person to a library consumed by conflagration. That is precisely what happened when the Ethiopian luminary, Dr. Dejazmatch Zewde Gebre-Sellassie, died of illness in Addis Ababa on 15 December 2008. He harmoniously combined oral tradition with profound western education, readily availing of them to any academic who sought his assistance. His popularity among people from all walks of life was immense. His funeral, which took place at the patriotic cemetery of the Trinity Cathedral, was attended by a huge crowd of mourners. The lawyer Ato Tasoma Gebre Mariam, who delivered the eulogy, praised him for his contribution to the various Ethiopian codes of law. A week-long exhibition of Zewde’s works and photos, accompanied by speeches by scholars and family members, was held in his memory at the main campus of Addis Ababa University.

Publications 
 
 The Conflict of Ethiopia and Eritrea: Causes and Solutions (Amharic)

References 

Foreign ministers of Ethiopia
Justice ministers of Ethiopia
Interior ministers of Ethiopia
Ethiopian scholars
Ethiopian writers
Ethiopian historians 
20th-century Ethiopian writers
21st-century Ethiopian writers
Ethiopian nobility